Krusenstern or Kruzenshtern may refer to:

 Adam Johann von Krusenstern (1770–1846), Baltic German admiral and explorer who circumnavigated the world in Russian service

Places named after von Krusenstern
 Krusenstern (crater), on the moon
 Krusenstern Island (disambiguation)
 A small group of islands in the Middendorff Bay
 Little Diomede Island, in Alaska
 Ailuk Atoll, in the Marshall Islands
 Tikehau-Atoll, of Tuamotu Archipelago in French Polynesia
 Krusenstern Strait, Kuril Islands, Russia
 Cape Krusenstern, in Alaska
 Cape Krusenstern National Monument in Alaska
 "Krusenstern Reef," "Krusenstern Rock," or "Krusenstern Island," a phantom reef south of the Northwestern Hawaiian Islands
 Mount Krusenstern, Novaya Zemlya, Russia

Other uses 
 Kruzenshtern (ship) (until 1946 German Padua), a Russian tall ship training vessel
 Krusenstern field, a natural gas field in Russia
 Cape Krusenstern, at the west end of Coronation Gulf, Canada

See also